Johann Siegele (born 23 November 1948) is an Austrian racewalker. He competed in the men's 20 kilometres walk at the 1980 Summer Olympics.

References

1948 births
Living people
Athletes (track and field) at the 1980 Summer Olympics
Austrian male racewalkers
Olympic athletes of Austria
Place of birth missing (living people)